For Good Old Times is a 2018 Croatian comedy film directed by Eduard Galić.

Cast
  - Hrvoje
  - Borna
  - Mirko
 Ksenija Pajić - Milka

References

External links 
 

Croatian comedy films
2018 comedy films
2010s Croatian-language films